Symone D. Sanders-Townsend (born December 10, 1989) is an American political strategist and commentator. She served as national press secretary for Democratic presidential candidate Bernie Sanders during his 2016 presidential campaign. She left the campaign abruptly in late June 2016, saying "she was not let go and that leaving the campaign was her decision." In October 2016, she was hired to be a Democratic strategist and political commentator by CNN. In April 2019, Symone Sanders joined the 2020 presidential campaign of former vice president Joe Biden as a senior advisor, and after Biden won election, was named chief spokesperson and a senior advisor for Vice President Kamala Harris. On December 2, 2021, Sanders announced that she would be resigning from her position by the end of 2021.

Early life and education
Sanders was raised in North Omaha, Nebraska. Her father, Daniel Sanders, is retired from the U.S. Army Corps of Engineers. Her mother, Terri Sanders, is the former publisher of the Omaha Star and former executive director for the Great Plains Black History Museum.

She attended Sacred Heart Catholic School. As a child, Sanders wanted to grow up to host her own television show. She used to walk around the house acting as Donna Burns, an imaginary television host.

Her first job was working at Time Out Foods in Omaha, a Black-owned restaurant. She graduated from Mercy High School.

Sanders attended Creighton University, and earned a bachelor's degree in business administration. While in college, she interned at a law firm, where she realized she didn't want to work in law.

Career 
Sanders worked in the communications department of former Omaha Mayor Jim Suttle and was deputy communications director for Democratic gubernatorial candidate Chuck Hassebrook in 2014.

In August 2015, Sanders joined the Bernie Sanders 2016 presidential campaign as the national press secretary. In December, Fusion listed Sanders as one of 30 women under 30 who would shape the 2016 election.

In June 2016, she quit the Sanders campaign. Later that year, she joined CNN as an analyst and commentator, and was recognized by Rolling Stone magazine as one of 16 Young Americans Shaping the 2016 Election.

She subsequently joined the presidential campaign of former vice president Joe Biden. In 2020, she published a memoir, No, You Shut Up, relating her personal experiences of speaking up to effectively fight  ideological battles.

On November 29, 2020, Sanders was named chief spokesperson and a senior advisor for Vice President Kamala Harris. On December 1, 2021, Symone Sanders announced her departure from that role. 

Shortly thereafter, MSNBC announced she would host a weekend program for the network, as well as a program on Peacock's The Choice. The new MSNBC program, Symone, premiered on May 7, 2022.

Personal life
Her husband is Shawn Townsend, Washington D.C.'s former "Night Mayor". The couple wed on Friday, July 15, 2022.  They live in Washington, D.C.

Works
 No, You Shut Up: Speaking Truth to Power and Reclaiming America. New York: Harper (2020).

References

External links

 
 

1989 births
African-American people in Nebraska politics
American political consultants
American political women
African-American women in politics
Bernie Sanders 2016 presidential campaign
Joe Biden 2020 presidential campaign
CNN people
Creighton University alumni
Living people
Nebraska Democrats
People associated with the 2016 United States presidential election
Political spokespersons
Writers from Omaha, Nebraska
Political commentators
Biden administration personnel
People from Washington, D.C.
American political writers
African-American women writers